"Revolving Door" is a song by American rap rock band Crazy Town. It was released in August 2001 as the fourth and final single from their debut album The Gift of Game. It was the followup single to their No. 1 hit Butterfly. Whilst failing to chart in the US, the song became a minor hit in several countries, reaching No. 19 in Finland and No. 23 in the UK.

Reception
Christian Genze from Allmusic stated that whilst "Revolving Door" was not a bad song by any means, it too closely resembled their previous single "Butterfly" to be a real standout. Genze stated both songs feature similar soft guitar loops, smooth beats and a relaxed mood, and that neither song was reflective of Crazy Town's album, The Gift of Game, on which the majority of songs are much heavier. Timothy Mark from NME gave the song and the band a negative review, criticising the song's premise and sexist lyrics.

Bonus tracks
Allmusic also stated that the remix of the single by Jay Gordon was better than the original, especially for repeated listening, but criticised the second bonus track, a live recording of "Butterfly", stating that the extremely monotonous vocals served only to remind people to avoid possible live albums by Crazy Town.

Music video
The music video for the single was directed by Gregory Dark, and was included as a bonus on the single. The video features Crazy Town performing in a mansion with a revolving door at the entrance. Crazy Town members are constantly surrounded by attractive women, including Kimberly Stewart and Monet Mazur, the cousin of the song’s co-writer, band member Epic Mazur. Scenes with celebrities including Tommy Lee and members of the band Incubus were filmed but cut from the final release. Then band member Squirrel said the video would not have worked as well as a "star-studded thing", saying that it was an attempt to "poke fun" at how the world perceived them after the success of Butterfly, concluding that he hoped people "will see this whole thing as a satire, because that's all it is". Allmusic stated that including the clip on the single was appreciated, though gave a negative review of the video itself, describing it as "silly" and stating that listening to Crazy Town was much more pleasant than actually seeing them.

Track listing

Charts

References

2001 singles
Crazy Town songs
2001 songs
Songs written by Epic Mazur
Song recordings produced by Josh Abraham
Columbia Records singles
Song recordings produced by Epic Mazur